Ridwan ( riḍwān) is an Arabic masculine given name and which the name also derived from the Islamic angel Riḍwan and means "grace, pleasure, satisfaction". In Islamic tradition, Riḍwan is the name of an angel in charge of maintaining the gates of Paradise, Jannah.

Variants
Other forms of Ridwan include "Ridhwan", "Rizwan", "Rizvan", and "Ridvan" or "Rıdvan" in  Albanian, Bosnian, Indonesian, Kashmiri, Malay, Pashto, Persian, Punjabi, Tajik, Turkish, Urdu, and other languages heavily influenced by Persian.

In Bangladesh, the name may be spelled as "Rizwan", "Rezwan", "Rejwan" or "Redhwan". It may also be transliterated as Redhwan or Redwan.

In Brunei, Malaysia, and Indonesia it is alternatively spelled as "Ridwan" or "Riduan". "Redouane" is the most common spelling in French.

The female equivalent of this name is "Ridwana" or "Rizwana".

People

See also 
 Ridwan (angel)

References

Arabic masculine given names